Damon Heta (born 10 August 1987) is an Australian professional darts player who plays in Professional Darts Corporation (PDC) events. He won the Brisbane Darts Masters in 2019 and also, in pair with Simon Whitlock, World Cup of Darts in 2022. His nickname is "The Heat", a play on letters within his surname. After World Cup win, his teammate Simon Whitlock regarded him as best player on the world. He has been married to the beautiful Meaghan since 2010.

Career
A roofer by trade, Heta has mainly played on the Dartplayers Australia (DPA) Tour. His first big exposure was qualifying for the 2014 Sydney Darts Masters, where he was whitewashed 6–0 in the first round by Dave Chisnall. Heta qualified for the 2016 Auckland Darts Masters where he lost in the first round to Michael van Gerwen 6–3. 

He qualified for the 2018 Melbourne Darts Masters, where he defeated his good friend Kyle Anderson 6–5 in the first round, before losing 10–7 to Gary Anderson in the quarter-finals. Gary would then defeat Heta 6–5 in the first round of the 2018 Brisbane Darts Masters a week later.

Amongst his titles achieved Down Under are the 2011 Pacific Masters, the 2014 DPA Australian Singles, the 2015 West Coast Classic, and the 2016 DPA Australian Open.

On 3 August 2019, Damon won the first ever DFA Australian Open Darts, beating top BDO players such as Jim Williams 8–1 in the semi-final and former World Champion Scott Mitchell 10–9 in the final to take the $15,000 first prize.

Heta qualified for all three PDC World Series events in Australia and New Zealand in 2019.

At the 2019 Brisbane Darts Masters Heta reached his first PDC final by beating former major winners James Wade, Gary Anderson and Simon Whitlock, before defeating former World Champion Rob Cross 8–7 in the final to win his first World Series title. Damon become the first ever non tour card holder to win a world series event and the first to win a world series event on home soil. He became the first non-tour card holder to win a PDC televised event since Scott Waites in 2010.

Heta beat James Wade once again in the first round of the 2019 Melbourne Darts Masters, but lost 8–3 to Rob Cross in the quarter-finals. He lost 6–1 to Peter Wright in the first round of the 2019 New Zealand Darts Masters.

On 19 January 2020, Heta won a two-year PDC Tour Card by finishing fourth on the UK Q School Order of Merit. He will play on the ProTour in 2020 and 2021. He won his first PDC ranking event at the PDC Autumn Series in Niedernhausen, beating Joe Cullen 8–4 in the final.

Heta, in conjunction with Simon Whitlock, beat Wales in the 2022 PDC World Cup of Darts on 19 June 2022 to claim the title for Australia for the first time, after Whitlock and Paul Nicholson lost in the grand final in 2012 to England.

Heta won the 2022 Gibraltar Darts Trophy on the PDC European Tour in October 2022, where along the way, he defeated Michael van Gerwen in the semi-final and Peter Wright in the final.

World Championship results

PDC
 2020: Second round (lost to Glen Durrant 0–3)
 2021: First round (lost to Danny Baggish 2–3)
 2022: Third round (lost to Peter Wright 2–4)
 2023: Third round (lost to Joe Cullen 0–4)

Career finals

PDC world series finals: 1 (1 title)

PDC team finals: 1 (1 title)

Performance timeline

PDC

PDC European Tour

References

External links

1987 births
Living people
Australian darts players
Professional Darts Corporation current tour card holders
Sportspeople from Perth, Western Australia
Sportspeople from London 
World Series of Darts winners
PDC ranking title winners
PDC World Cup of Darts Australian championship team